"Cobrastyle" is a song performed by Swedish band Teddybears, featuring Jamaican singer Mad Cobra. The song was released on their 2004 album  Fresh, and reissued on their 2006 album Soft Machine. It was released as a single on 6 June 2006.

Music video
The music video for "Cobrastyle" features a stop-motion Gorilla and Cobra robot attacking each other in front of a mountain range, while Teddybears and Mad Cobra perform the song.

Usage in media
The song has been featured in the pilot episodes of two American television programs, Chuck and Teen Wolf. It was featured in S1:E2 of the American television miniseries The Dropout. It was also used in the comedy films After the Sunset, Date Night, The Benchwarmers, Employee of the Month, College Road Trip, Don't Hang Up, Diary of a Wimpy Kid (film), Rise, Shamlet, the video game FIFA 06, FIFA 23 and Forza MotorSports 2, the trailers for Epic Movie, G-Force and Megamind. and was featured in a KFC ad in the UK, as well as an ad for the Volvo XC40 Recharge. It was also featured in S3:E6 of Grey's Anatomy.

Track listing
 CD single
 "Cobrastyle" – 2:59
 "Cobrastyle"  – 2:59
 "Cobrastyle"  – 2:41

Charts

Weekly charts

Year-end charts

Robyn version

"Cobrastyle" was covered by Swedish singer and songwriter Robyn on her 2006 EP, The Rakamonie EP. The cover was included on the international edition of her self-titled album Robyn. The song was released as a single in Australia in September 2007, as a part of the double A-side single "Konichiwa Bitches" / "Cobrastyle".

Promotion 

Ahead of the October 2007 Australian release of Robyn through Modular Recordings, "Konichiwa Bitches" and "Cobrastyle" were released together as a double A-side single, a month before the album's release. To promote the album and single, Robyn performed two concerts in Australia in mid-September.

In May 2008, Robyn performed the song with the Teddybears on the Late Show with David Letterman and The View.

Critical reception 

Daniel Rivera of PopMatters called Robyn's version "a damn near perfect Teddy Bears cover (easily surpassing the original)", while LA Music Blog thought the song was "futuristic and brilliant". Robyn's cover version was listed as number 61 on Rolling Stones list of the 100 Best Songs of 2008, who praised the song's "blast of freezy-cool electro that oozes sass."

The New Yorker described "Cobrastyle" as a "fast, chattering electronic track that runs at a punk tempo, except for the moments when it drops in fragments of dancehall rhythms", feeling that Robyn's lyrical delivery was "a mash of language from everywhere and nowhere, and sound decidedly un-Swedish". Stephen M. Deusner of Pitchfork felt her delivery was Robyn "playfully [turning] Mad Cobra's Jamaican patois into a dance nursery rhyme". Prefix Magazine felt that the lyrics of "Cobrastyle" and Robyn in general were "wonderfully dumb throughout...Robyn clearly has a fondness for big empty pop that sounds good but says little", feeling that "it takes a hardened soul to withstand the charms of an album" with lyrics such as "Cobrastyle"'s.

In a mixed review by for GayCalgary Magazine, Rob Diaz-Marino found "Cobrastyle" melodically likable, but "felt like something was being held back".

Music videos
Two music videos were produced for "Cobrastyle". The first was released on 25 April 2008 as a viral video, and features Robyn and Perez Hilton (among others) playing strip poker. The second was released on 10 October 2008. The video shows Robyn and other musicians dressed in white and set against a white background. As the band performs, graffiti artists cover the scene in paint.

Formats and track listings
"Konichiwa Bitches" / "Cobrastyle"
"Konichiwa Bitches" – 2:38
"Cobrastyle" – 4:12
"Konichiwa Bitches" (Trentemøller Remix) – 6:25
"Cobrastyle" (Muscles Remix) – 3:52

"Cobrastyle Remixes" (US Promo)
"Cobrastyle" (Mason Remix) – 5:30
"Cobrastyle" (Adam K & Soha Remix) – 6:42
"Cobrastyle" (The Touch Remix) – 6:08
"Cobrastyle" (Samim Remix) – 6:10
"Cobrastyle" (The Bloody Beetroots Remix) – 4:01
"Cobrastyle" (Mason Dub) – 5:29
"Cobrastyle" (The Bloody Beetroots Instrumental) – 4:02

Charts

Release history

References

2004 singles
2004 songs
2007 singles
Teddybears (band) songs
Robyn songs
Songs written by Klas Åhlund
Songs written by Sylvia Robinson
Songs written by Joakim Åhlund